Dal makhani (pronounced [daːl ˈmək.kʰə.ni]) is a dish originating in New Delhi, India. A relatively modern variation of traditional lentil dishes, it is made with urad dal (black beans) and other pulses, and includes butter and cream (makhan is Hindi for butter).

History
Kundan Lal Jaggi and Kundan Lal Gujral, both Punjabi Hindu migrants from Peshawar, had already invented butter chicken and were looking to create a vegetarian dish that would complement it. A regular diner at Moti Mahal, the restaurant that Jaggi ran in Daryaganj in Delhi, suggested that something exciting could be created out of urad dal commonly used in traditional dishes, leading to the invention of dal makhani.

See also

 List of legume dishes
 North Indian cuisine
 Punjabi cuisine

References

Indian curries
Lentil dishes
Indian cuisine
North Indian cuisine
Punjabi cuisine
Vegetarian dishes of India